Kim Dong-Young (born 6 March 1980) is a South Korean race walker.

Achievements

References

Notes

1980 births
Living people
South Korean male racewalkers
Athletes (track and field) at the 2004 Summer Olympics
Athletes (track and field) at the 2008 Summer Olympics
Athletes (track and field) at the 2012 Summer Olympics
Olympic athletes of South Korea
Athletes (track and field) at the 2010 Asian Games
Athletes (track and field) at the 2002 Asian Games
Asian Games competitors for South Korea
Competitors at the 2001 Summer Universiade
Competitors at the 2003 Summer Universiade
Sportspeople from Busan